Ezequiel A Di Paolo (born in Buenos Aires, 1970) is a full-time Research Professor at Ikerbasque, the Basque Foundation for Science. He also has affiliations with the Centre for Computational Neuroscience and Robotics at the University of Sussex. His field of research covers enactivism and embodiment in cognitive science.

Education 
Di Paolo studied Physics at the University of Buenos Aires and obtained a Master of Science degree in Nuclear Engineering from the Balseiro Institute in Argentina. He has a PhD degree in Computer Science and Artificial Intelligence from the University of Sussex.

Academic work 
His work includes research in  embodied cognition, dynamical systems, adaptive behaviour in natural and artificial systems, biological modelling, complex systems, evolutionary robotics, and philosophy of science. His research is in the tradition established by Varela, Thompson and Rosch, which was an early example of the embodied, enactive approach to cognition.

Di Paolo believes that embodiment and enactivism have the potential to increase our understanding in traditional problems of cognition, and advocates that these alternative views should be explored and developed further, rather than being subsumed (or 'watered down') under more traditional frameworks, such as the cartesian dualistic model.

His promotion and exploration  of embodiment and enactivism is carried on through his work in the academic consortium eSMCs, an EU funded project to investigate the role of sensorimotor contingencies in cognition.

Additionally, he is involved in Centre for LIfe, Mind and Society, a research group spanning complex systems in biology and self-organising systems.

Other areas of his work include social cognition and intersubjectivity. He is involved as principal investigator with the Marie-Curie Initial Training Network TESIS — Towards an Embodied Science of InterSubjectivity.

He is Editor-in-chief of the interdisciplinary journal Adaptive Behavior.

Publications 

Di Paolo, E. A. (2010). Robotics inspired in the organism. Intellectica, 53-54, 129–162.

References

External links 
 Personal blog
 University of Sussex

Enactive cognition
Cognitive scientists
Philosophers of science
Living people
1970 births
Researchers of artificial life
Alumni of the University of Sussex